Cobelura is a genus of beetles in the family Cerambycidae, containing the following species:

 Cobelura claviger (Bates, 1885)
 Cobelura howdenorum Corbett, 2004
 Cobelura lorigera Erichson, 1847
 Cobelura peruviana (Aurivillius, 1920)
 Cobelura sergioi Monné, 1984
 Cobelura stockwelli Corbett, 2004
 Cobelura vermicularis Kirsch, 1889
 Cobelura wappesi Corbett, 2004

References

Acanthocinini